Soul Deep is the fifth studio album by Australian rock singer Jimmy Barnes. It was his sixth consecutive Australian No. 1 album. The album is a collection of soul covers and featured duets with John Farnham and Diesel. A special edition was later released in a black fold-out cover with embossed gold lettering and included five bonus live tracks and a set of collector cards.

Soul Deep 30
The album was reissued for its 30th anniversary on 17 June 2022, titled Soul Deep 30. It includes the 12 original Soul Deep recordings, with four new songs (two placed before the original 12 tracks, and two after). A limited deluxe physical edition includes the 1991 Soul Deep Live at the Palais concert on CD and DVD. The album debuted at number one on the ARIA Albums Chart on 24 June 2022.

Track listing

Live at the Palais 1991 DVD
Barnes toured Australia with Soul Deep and recorded the concert at Melbourne's Palais Theatre. It was released on VHS, and later, DVD. The DVD and audio of the concert on CD was later included with a limited deluxe edition of the Soul Deep 30 reissue.

 "(Your Love Keeps Lifting Me) Higher and Higher"
 "Respect"
 "Ain't No Mountain High Enough"
 "Here I Am (Come and Take Me)" 
 "Signed Sealed Delivered (I'm Yours)"
 "I Found a Love"
 "Reach Out I'll Be There"
 "Many Rivers to Cross"
 "Show Me"
 "Try a Little Tenderness"
 "Stagger Lee"
 "Bring It On Home to Me" (with Diesel)
 "Sister Mercy" (with Ross Wilson)
 "I Gotcha"
 "Little Darling"
 "River Deep Mountain High"
 "When Something Is Wrong with My Baby" (with John Farnham)
 "Sweet Soul Music" (with Ross Wilson and Diesel)
 "In the Midnight Hour" (with Diesel and John Farnham)

Personnel
 Jimmy Barnes – vocals
 Tony Brock – drums, percussion
 Diesel – guitar, vocals on track 10
 Jeff Neill – guitar
 Rick Will – guitar
 Michael Hegerty – bass guitar
 Jimmy Haslip – bass
 Mal Logan – keyboards
 Phil Shenale – keyboards
 John Farnham – vocals on track 3
 Jimmy Barnes, Diesel, Marcy Levy, Wendy Fraser, Jessica Williams, Jeff Neill – backing vocals
 John Courtney – trombone
 Kevin Dubber – trumpet
 Mark Dennison – baritone saxophone
 Marty Hill – tenor saxophone
 Rick O'Neil – mastering engineer

Charts and certifications

Weekly charts

Year-end charts

Certifications

See also
 List of number-one albums in Australia during the 1990s
 List of number-one albums of 2022 (Australia)

References

1991 albums
ARIA Award-winning albums
Jimmy Barnes albums
Albums produced by Don Gehman
Covers albums
Mushroom Records albums